TFTW may refer to:

Tactical Fighter Training Wing
Trees For The World